The Commandry of Nemerow (German: Komturei Nemerow or Komturei Gardow) was a commandry of the Knights Hospitaller in the village of Klein Nemerow in Mecklenburg-Vorpommern. It existed from 1285 until 1648. It was originally centred on Gardow, a now-ruined village near Wokuhl-Dabelow.

References

External links
Landesbibliographie-mv.de

Nemerow

Nemerow
Nemerow